WGBI-LP, virtual and UHF digital channel 21, was a low-power Retro TV-affiliated television station licensed to Farmington, Maine, United States. The station was owned by the Global Broadcast Network, Inc. (not to be confused with the Global Television Network in Canada).

History
The station first signed on in June 1995 as W21BI, an owned-and-operated satellite repeater of the Trinity Broadcasting Network. Global Broadcast Network purchased the station in 2006, and changed the call letters to WGBI-LP. Upon flash-cutting to digital broadcasting on November 6, 2010, WGBI affiliated with RTV.

Prior to its current use, the call letters WGBI were used on radio and television stations in Scranton, Pennsylvania from the 1920s until 2005. Those stations are now WAAF (910 AM), WGGY (101.3 FM), and WYOU-TV (channel 22).

The station's license was cancelled by the Federal Communications Commission on July 20, 2021, as WGBI-LP did not obtain a license for digital operation prior to the July 13, 2021 deadline.

References

Retro TV affiliates
GBI-LP
Farmington, Maine
Television channels and stations established in 1995
1995 establishments in Maine
Defunct television stations in the United States
Television channels and stations disestablished in 2021
2021 disestablishments in Maine
GBI-LP